Cornelius "Cor" Schilder, M.H.M. (born 19 September 1941) is an emeritus Roman Catholic Bishop from the Netherlands. He was the bishop of the Roman Catholic Diocese of Ngong in Kenya from 2003 to 2009.

Biography
Cornelius Schilder was born on 19 September 1941 in Westwoud in the Netherlands. He studied philosophy at Mill Hill College in Roosendaal, and later theology at Mill Hill College in London, England. On 29 June 1968, he was ordained as priest in Westwoud. In 1971, he went to Kenya with the Mill Hill Missionaries and worked in the dioceses Ngong and Garissa. In 2002, he was appointed Bishop of Ngong after Colin Cameron Davies retired. On 25 January 2003 he was consecrated as bishop. In 2009, he retired "due to [a] health problem".

Although highly esteemed, after contradicting allegations of sexual abuse of a boy, many years ago, and of which there was no proof, it is claimed that the Vatican induced the bishop when in his late sixties into retirement. Schilder currently does not celebrate masses in public and exercises no pastoral tasks. He lives with the Mill Hill Missionaries in Oosterbeek, Netherlands.

References

1941 births
Living people
Dutch Roman Catholic missionaries
21st-century Roman Catholic bishops in Kenya
People from Drechterland
Roman Catholic missionaries in Kenya
Dutch expatriates in Kenya
Roman Catholic bishops of Ngong